Cephalodiscus graptolitoides is a sessile hemichordate belonging to the order Cephalodiscida.

It has encrusting tubaria.

References

graptolitoides